The Royal Police Escort is the royal police in the Kingdom of Norway.

Responsible for safeguarding the King and members of the Royal Family, the Royal Police Escort serves as bodyguards during official and private activities within the Kingdom and abroad. The Royal Police Escort also guards foreign royalty on their official or private visits in Norway and foreign (including republican) heads of state on their official visits.

A section of the Norwegian Police Service, the Royal Police Escort sorts under the Oslo Chief of Police. They cooperate closely with the Norwegian Police Security Service. Members of the Royal Police Escort are individually selected and especially trained police officers.

The Royal Police Escort was established on 11 May 1945, shortly before Crown Prince Olav's return to the Kingdom following the end of the five-year-long German occupation. The coat of arms of the Royal Police Escort displays a golden St. Olaf axe on a red shield.

Links 
 The Royal Court: The Norwegian Royal Police Escort (Visited on 3 July 2013.)
 Verdens Gang: Dette er kongens millioneskorte (Visited on 3 July 2013.)

Norwegian monarchy
Law enforcement agencies of Norway
Government agencies established in 1945
1945 establishments in Norway